An antihypotensive agent, also known as a vasopressor agent or simply vasopressor, or pressor, is any substance, whether endogenous or a medication, that tends to raise low blood pressure. Some antihypotensive drugs act as vasoconstrictors to increase total peripheral resistance, others sensitize adrenoreceptors to catecholamines - glucocorticoids, and the third class increase cardiac output - dopamine, dobutamine.

If low blood pressure is due to blood loss, then preparations increasing volume of blood circulation—plasma-substituting solutions such as colloid and crystalloid solutions (salt solutions)—will raise the blood pressure without any direct vasopressor activity. Packed red blood cells, plasma or whole blood should not be used solely for volume expansion or to increase oncotic pressure of circulating blood. Blood products should only be used if reduced oxygen carrying capacity or coagulopathy is present. Other causes of either absolute (dehydration, loss of plasma via wound/burns) or relative (third space losses) vascular volume depletion also respond, although blood products are only indicated if significantly anemic.

Classification
Antihypotensive agents can be classified as follows:

 Sympathomimetics
 Epinephrine
 Noradrenaline
 Phenylephrine
 Dobutamine
 Dopamine
 Dopexamine
 Ephedrine
 Midodrine
 Amezinium
 Metaraminol
 Vasopressin
 Angiotensinamide
 S-alkylisothiouronium derivatives
 Difetur
 Izoturon
 Glucocorticoids and mineralocorticoids
 Hydrocortisone
 Prednisone, Prednisolone
 Dexamethasone, Betamethasone
 Fludrocortisone
 Positive inotropic agents
 Cardiac glycosides
 Strophantin K
 Convallatoxin
 Digoxin
 PDE3 inhibitors
 Amrinone
 Enoximone
 Milrinone
 Levosimendan

References

 
Cardiac stimulants
Intensive care medicine